Prince Gustav Otto Maximilian Lamoral of Thurn and Taxis (23 February 1848 – 9 July 1914), full German name: Gustav Otto Maximilian Lamoral Prinz von Thurn und Taxis, was the sixth child of Maximilian Karl, 6th Prince of Thurn and Taxis and his second wife Princess Mathilde Sophie of Oettingen-Oettingen and Oettingen-Spielberg. He was born on 2 February 1848 in Regensburg, Kingdom of Bavaria.

Family
Paul, one of his elder brothers, was an intimate friend and aide-de-camp of King Ludwig II of Bavaria.

Marriage
On 8 September 1877, Gustav married Princess Karoline of Thurn and Taxis, daughter of Hugo Maximilian Prince of Thurn and Taxis and Almeria Countess of Belcredi, in Lautschin, Austria-Hungary. The couple did not have any children.

Later life
From 1882 to 1888, he was Bezirkshauptmann of Bregenz, Vorarlberg, Austria-Hungary, where he died at the age of 66 on 9 July 1914.

In 1884, Prince Gustav acquired the Villa Güllich in Bregenz, which is known today as Palais Thurn & Taxis with a public park area of about 16000 m2, which is heritage-protected. Since 1984, the Palais also houses an international center for contemporary art.

Ancestry

Citations 

1848 births
1914 deaths
German Roman Catholics
People from Regensburg
Princes of Thurn und Taxis